Listed below are the dates and results for the 2006 FIFA World Cup qualification rounds for Asia.

44 Asian teams are affiliated with FIFA, but Cambodia, Philippines, Bhutan and Brunei decided not to take part, and Myanmar was banned from the competition (for refusing to play a qualifier in Iran during 2002 qualifying), so a total of 39 teams took part, competing for 4.5 places in the World Cup.

Format
The qualification was composed of three rounds. Only the 14 last ranked teams according to FIFA took part in the Preliminary Round, where they were paired 2-by-2 and played home-and-away knock-out matches. The 7 winners joined the other 25 teams in the Second Round, where those 32 teams were divided in 8 groups of four teams each. The teams in each group would play against each other home-and-away, and the team with most points in each group would advance to the Third Round.

In the Third Round, the 8 remaining teams were divided in two groups of 4 teams each, that would again play against each other in a home-and-away basis. The two teams with most points in each group would qualify to the World Cup. The two third placed teams would play-off against each other home-and-away. Winner of this play-off would play against the fourth placed team in the Final Round of CONCACAF in an intercontinental play-off for a place in the World Cup.

First round

Guam and Nepal were scheduled to play against each other on November 21 and 25; Nepal withdrew, so Guam progressed to the 2nd round, but Guam later withdrew.

FIFA then decided to elect a "lucky loser", to select the best of the teams that lost, to advance to the Second Round.

The losers were compared, using the following criteria to break ties: a) number of points; b) goal difference; c) goals scored.

Laos advanced to the Second Round.

Second round

In the second round, the 25 teams who received byes, as well as the 7 play-off round winners, were split into eight groups of four teams each. Teams played home-and-away games with the other teams in their group, and the top-ranked team qualified for the third round.

Group 1

Group 2

Group 3

Group 4

Group 5

Group 6

Group 7

Group 8

Third round

In the third round, the 8 teams who won their groups in the earlier round were split into two groups of four teams each. Teams played home-and-away games with the other teams in their group, and the top two teams qualified for the 2006 FIFA World Cup. Meanwhile, the third-placed teams entered a play-off to determine who would contest the AFC–CONCACAF play-off.

Group 1

Saudi Arabia and Korea Republic qualified for the 2006 FIFA World Cup.
Uzbekistan advanced to the AFC playoffs.

Group 2

Japan and Iran qualified for the 2006 FIFA World Cup.
Bahrain advanced to the AFC playoffs.

Fourth round

Teams finishing 3rd in the third round groups played each other to determine a possible 5th qualifier from Asia. The first leg was originally played on 3 September 2005 but the match was ordered to be replayed by FIFA after a refereeing mistake. With Uzbekistan leading the tie 1–0, a penalty was awarded to them but the referee disallowed the resulting goal and offered an indirect freekick to Bahrain for encroachment. Uzbekistan had formally requested for the match to be recorded as an automatic 3–0 victory.

Bahrain advanced to the AFC–CONCACAF play-off on the away goals rule.

Inter-confederation play-offs

The Fourth Round winner then played the fourth-placed team of the CONCACAF qualifying group, Trinidad and Tobago, in a home-and-away play-off. The winner of this play-off qualified for the 2006 FIFA World Cup finals.

Qualified teams
The following four teams from AFC qualified for the final tournament.

1 Bold indicates champions for that year. Italic indicates hosts for that year.

Goalscorers
There were 401 goals scored in 136 matches (including 2 international play-offs), for an average of 2.95 goals per match.
9 goals

 Ali Daei

6 goals

 A'ala Hubail
 Lee Dong-gook
 Ali Ashfaq
 Begençmuhammet Kulyýew

5 goals

 Husain Ali
 Ilham Jaya Kesuma
 Bashar Abdullah
 Maksim Shatskikh

4 goals

 Vahid Hashemian
 Hong Yong-jo
 Bader Al-Mutawa
 Badar Al-Maimani
 Yasser Al-Qahtani
 Alexander Geynrikh

3 goals

 Talal Yousef
 Hao Haidong
 Li Jinyu
 Huang Wei-yi
 Javad Nekounam
 Razzaq Farhan
 Qusay Munir
 Takashi Fukunishi
 Mitsuo Ogasawara
 Takayuki Suzuki
 Badran Al Shagran
 Roda Antar
 Ali Nasseredine
 Sergey Chikishev
 Ibrahim Fazeel
 Ahmed Thoriq
 Roberto Kettlun
 Saad Al-Harthi
 Sami Al-Jaber
 Ibrahim Sowed
 Rejepmyrat Agabaýew
 Guwançmuhammet Öwekow
 Mohamed Omer
 Server Djeparov
 Mirjalol Qosimov
 Anvarjon Soliev
 Phan Văn Tài Em

2 goals

 Li Xiaopeng
 Shao Jiayi
 Chen Jui-te
 Chu Siu Kei
 P. Renedy Singh
 Arash Borhani
 Reza Enayati
 Mehdi Mahdavikia
 Alireza Vahedi Nikbakht
 Ebrahim Taghipour
 Salih Sadir
 Ahmad Mnajed
 Tatsuhiko Kubo
 Yuji Nakazawa
 Masashi Oguro
 An Yong-hak
 Kim Yong-su
 Kim Do-heon
 Lee Young-pyo
 Park Chu-young
 Mesaed Al Enezi
 Faraj Laheeb
 Evgeny Boldygin
 Mohamed Nizam
 Ahmed Mubarak
 Mohamed Al Hinai
 Amad Ali
 Khalifa Ayil Al-Naufli
 Taysir Amer
 Safwan Habaib
 Sayed Ali Bechir
 Mubarak Fazli
 Waleed Hamzah
 Waleed Jassem
 Talal Al-Meshal
 Mohammad Al-Shalhoub
 Mohammed Noor
 Indra Sahdan Daud
 Raja Rafe
 Yousef Shekh Eleshra
 Pirmurod Burkhanov
 Numonjon Hakimov
 Akmal Kholmatov
 Yusuf Rabiev
 Kiatisuk Senamuang
 Nazar Bayramov
 Wladimir Baýramow
 Leonid Koshelev
 Ali Al Nono

1 goal

 Duaij Naser Abdulla
 Mohamed Hubail
 Mohamed Husain
 Salman Isa
 Sayed Mahfoodh
 Li Weifeng
 Sun Jihai
 Xu Yunlong
 Yu Genwei
 Chang Wu-yeh
 Chiang Shih-lu
 Chuang Yao-tsung
 Kwok Yue Hung
 Ng Wai Chiu
 Wong Chun Yue
 Elie Aiboy
 Ismed Sofyan
 Budi Sudarsono
 Mohammad Nosrati
 Rahman Rezaei
 Nashat Akram
 Ahmad Salah Alwan
 Saad Attiya
 Hussam Fawzi
 Younis Mahmoud
 Emad Mohammed
 Jassim Swadi
 Toshiya Fujita
 Akira Kaji
 Tsuneyasu Miyamoto
 Shunsuke Nakamura
 Shinji Ono
 Naohiro Takahara
 Keiji Tamada
 Atsushi Yanagisawa
 Abdelhadi Al Maharmeh
 Haitham Al Shboul
 Hatem Aqel
 Moayad Mansour
 Awad Ragheb
 Mustafa Shehdeh
 Mahmoud Shelbaieh
 An Chol-hyok
 Choe Chol-man
 Kim Chol-ho
 Nam Song-chol
 Ri Han-jae
 Ri Hyok-chol
 Pak Song-gwan
 Sin Yong-nam
 Ahn Jung-hwan
 Cha Du-ri
 Cho Byung-kuk
 Choi Jin-cheul
 Lee Chun-soo
 Park Ji-sung
 Abdul Al Dawood
 Fahad Al Hamad
 Hamad Al Harbi
 Waleed Jumah
 Nawaf Humaidan
 Husain Seraj
 Vyacheslav Amin
 Valeri Berezovsky
 Vladimir Chertkov
 Azamat Ishenbaev
 Emil Kenjisariev
 Andrey Krasnov
 Phutthadavong Chanthalome
 Visay Phaphouvanin
 Sengphet Thongphachan
 Faysal Antar
 Mahmoud Chahoud
 Khaled Hamieh
 Haitham Zein
 Fu Weng Lei
 Rosdi Talib
 Mohd Amri Yahyah
 Assad Ghani
 Mohamed Nazeeh
 Ali Umar
 Ahmed Al Mukhaini
 Yousef Shaaban
 Francisco Atura
 Ziyad Al-Kord
 Ahmed Keshkesh
 Imad Zatara
 Meshal Abdullah
 Mohamed Salem Al Hamad
 Nayef Al Khater
 Saad Al-Shammari
 Bilal Mohammed
 Nasser Kamil Mubarak
 Wesam Rizik
 Sami Al-Anbar
 Talal Al-Meshal
 Fahad Fallata
 Saud Kariri
 Omar Sulaimani
 Khairul Mohd
 Channa Ediri
 Mohamed Hameed
 Kasun Jayasuriya
 Dudley Steinwall
 Chandradasa Karunaratne
 Rathnayake Mudyanselage
 Isuru Perera
 Jehad Al-Hussain
 Mohamad Yehya Al Rashed
 Meaataz Kailouni
 Sukhrob Hamidov
 Sarayoot Chaikamdee
 Therdsak Chaiman
 Jiensathawong Jakapong
 Anon Nanok
 Niweat Siriwong
 Sutee Suksomkit
 Nirut Surasiang
 Dovlet Bayramov
 Omar Berdiýew
 Gurbangeldi Durdiyev
 Artem Nazarov
 Didargylyç Urazow
 Rashid Abdulrahman
 Saleh Obaid
 Mohamed Rashid
 Bakhtiyor Ashurmatov
 Marat Bikmaev
 Vladimir Shishelov
 Nguyễn Minh Hai
 Phạm Văn Quyến
 Radwan Abduljabar
 Akram Al Selwi
 Saleh Al-Shehri
 Fathi Jaber

1 own goal

 Mohamed Salmeen (playing against Japan)
 Yahya Golmohammadi (playing against Qatar)
 Ebrahim Mirzapour (playing against Japan)
 Nitsavong Khoupchansy (playing against Iran)
 Battulga Khishigdalai (playing against Maldives)

References

External links
2006 FIFA World Cup qualification (AFC) at RSSSF.com

 
FIFA World Cup qualification (AFC)